Jongno is a constituency of the National Assembly of South Korea. The constituency only consists of the Jongno District, Seoul. As of 2020, 134,516 eligible voters were registered in the constituency. In the course of the Democratic Party of Korea's primary election, Lee Nak-yeon, a member of the district's National Assembly, resigned.

List of members of the National Assembly

Election results

2020

2016

2012

2008

2004

2002 (by-election)

2000

1998 (by-election)

1996

1992

1988

References 

Constituencies of the National Assembly (South Korea)